Grêmio Esportivo Juventus, commonly known as Juventus or Juventus-SC, is a Brazilian football club based in Jaraguá do Sul, Santa Catarina state. They competed twice in the Série C.

History
The club was founded on 1 May 1966. Juventus competed in the Série C in 1995 and in 1996.

Achievements

 Campeonato Catarinense Second Level:
 Winners (1): 2004

Stadium
Grêmio Esportivo Juventus play their home games at Estádio João Marcatto. The stadium has a maximum capacity of 10,000 people.

References

 
Association football clubs established in 1966
Football clubs in Santa Catarina (state)
1966 establishments in Brazil